Irandu Mugam is a 2010 Indian Tamil-language political action film directed by R. Aravindraj. The film featured Sathyaraj and Karan . The film released to good reviews on 3 September 2010 portraying the poor political system in India.

Plot
Parthasarathy (Karan) is the son of a cook and a political science graduate. He aspires to become a minister. His mimicry skills get him acquainted with the Chief Minister, who comes to his village for a meeting. He impresses him to become local leader of the party. This incurs him the wrath of Thamizh Sakthi (Nassar), a leader of the same party, who wants to promote his younger brother.

A turn of events leads to Thamizh Sakthi helping Parthasarathy become MLA with a promise that he should be with him and support him in all shady deals. As it happens, Parthasarathy now becomes a minister. Their corrupt ways earn them money.

There is one Pavithra (Suhani Kalita), the daughter of opposition leader who is in love with Parthasarathy. Meanwhile, enters Sarveswaran (Sathyaraj), an IAS officer who is committed to clean the political system. He has a bad past. He hatches a conspiracy and succeeds in reforming Parthasarathy. The duo now starts to work for the welfare of the people and also bring to book the greedy and corrupt.

Cast
 Sathyaraj as Sarveswaren
 Karan as Parthasarathy
 Suhani Kalita as Pavithra
 Anu Hasan as Sarveswaran's wife
 Nassar as Tamizh Sakthi
 Livingston as Parthasarathy's uncle
 Anuradha Krishnamoorthy as Deivanayaki
 Malavika Avinash as Thilakavathy
 M. S. Bhaskar 
 Ganja Karuppu 
 Elango Kumaravel as Parthasarathy's friend
 Charuhasan as a Chief Doctor
 Vani Sree Shetty in assassins group

Soundtrack
The soundtrack was composed by Bharadwaj.

"Kannum Kannum" — Karthik, Surmukhi Raman
"Minsaram" — Sathyan, Sunitha Menon
"Yaanai Ketti" — Mukesh Mohamed, Ananthu, Surmega
"Aasa Vachen" — Sunitha Menon
"Penn Nenjam" — Bharadwaj

Critical reception
Sify wrote "If you are looking for pure escapist masala fare, Irandu Mugam is just ok." Times of India wrote "It is an exciting storyline. But the director falls prey to the beaten-to-death formula — improbable fight scenes included."

References

External links
 
 Irandu Mugam at Oneindia.in

2010 films
2010 action films
2010s Tamil-language films
Films scored by Bharadwaj (composer)
Indian political films
Indian political thriller films
Films directed by R. Aravindraj